Morelos is a station on the Mexico City Metro. It is located 
in Venustiano Carranza borough, in the north of Mexico City.

General information
The station logo depicts the profile of José María Morelos y Pavón, second instigator of the War of Independence of 1810. Its name refers to the neighborhood which it serves.

This station has a peculiar feature; it is the only one that has two different logos: one, the profile of Morelos shown above; the other, a ¾-view of him. Both logos were stylized reproductions of peso coins from the 1980s. Today the ¾-view logo is used only in the Line 4 area of the station.

Morelos was originally to be named Metro Terminal Tapo, referring to the eastern intercity bus station. (locally known as "la Tapo"), located about a kilometre away; for this reason, the Metro authorities decided instead to name the station for the neighborhood which it serves. Metro San Lázaro is closer to the bus station and, in fact, is directly connected to it by means of a pedestrian tunnel.

Morelos has facilities for the handicapped and a cultural display.

Ridership

References

External links
 

Morelos
Railway stations opened in 1981
Railway stations opened in 1999
1981 establishments in Mexico
1999 establishments in Mexico
Mexico City Metro Line B stations
Mexico City Metro stations in Venustiano Carranza, Mexico City
Accessible Mexico City Metro stations